This is a list of boundary changes occurring in the East Midlands region of England, since the re-organisation of local government following the passing of the Local Government Act 1972.

Administrative boundaries

Initial creation
When the Local Government Act 1972 was passed there were still some details left to be decided, the Local Government Boundary Commission for England's first work was to clarify these details.

Principal Area Boundary Reviews
The Local Government Boundary Commission for England (or LGBCE) was established by the Local Government Act 1972 to review the administrative boundaries of every local authority in England. Between 1974 and 1992 they completed a series of Principal Area Boundary Reviews; reviewing the administrative boundaries of local authorities at their request.

Other principal area boundary reviews		
Report No. 431: Charnwood/North West Leicestershire August 1982
Report No. 509: Hinckley and Bosworth/Blaby November 1985

Mandatory Reviews of non-Metropolitan Counties, Metropolitan Districts and London Boroughs
In 1985 they began the first full administrative review of all non-metropolitan counties. Their reviews of metropolitan counties and Greater London began in 1987 and both reviews were completed in 1992.

Other mandatory meviews of non-metropolitan counties, metropolitan districts and London boroughs
Report No. 562: Cheshire August 1988
Report No. 563: Humberside September 1988
Report No. 601: Barnsley February 1991
Report No. 609: Nottinghamshire November 1991

Electoral boundaries

Initial creation
When the Local Government Act 1972 was passed there was not sufficient time to draw up proper electoral boundaries for the new county and district councils, so a temporary system was quickly put in place, intended to only be used for the first elections in 1973.

First periodic review
The Local Government Boundary Commission for England (or LGBCE) was established by the Local Government Act 1972 to review the electoral boundaries of every local authority in England. In 1974 they began the first full electoral review of all metropolitan and non-metropolitan districts, completing it in July 1980. Their reviews of the county councils were completed in 1984.

Further electoral reviews by the LGBCE
Local authorities could request a further review if they felt that there were changes in circumstances since the initial review. The LGBCE would only approve this if they felt it was appropriate because of major changes in the size or distribution of the electorate.

Second periodic review
The Local Government Act 1992 established the Local Government Commission for England (or LGCE) as the successor to the LGBCE. In 1996 they began the second full electoral review of English local authorities. On 1 April 2002 the Boundary Committee for England (or BCfE) took over the functions of the LGBCE and carried on the review, completing it in 2004.

Further electoral reviews by the BCfE

Further electoral reviews by the LGBCE
The Local Government Boundary Commission for England (or LGBCE) was established by the Local Democracy, Economic Development and Construction Act 2009 on 1 April 2010 as the successor to the BCfE. It continues to review the electoral arrangements of English local authorities on an ‘as and when’ basis.

Structural changes

Other structural reviews 
Northamptonshire - Draft report July 1994 Final report December 1994
Broxtowe, Gedling and Rushcliffe - Draft report September 1995 Final report December 1995
Northampton - Draft report September 1995 Final report December 1995
A report on the 1992-1995 Structural Review May 1995
Overview report of 21 Districts in England September 1995

References

External links
"Boundary Legislation Changes from 1973" Excel spreadsheet from the Ordnance Survey.

Lists of English county boundary changes
Boundary changes